Emergence is the first studio album by Natasha St-Pier released in 1996.

Track listing 

 Sans le savoir (single)
 Il ne sait pas (single)
 Les Magiciens
 Pourquoi tu m'aimes
 J'aim cru trouver l'amour
 Mou'tian (Sung in Cantonese, Originally sung by Hong Kong singer-actress Kelly Chen)
 "Le Parcours du cœur"
 Portés par la vague (single)
 Friends (Sung in English)
 Le Monde à refaire
 Repose ton âme

1996 albums
Natasha St-Pier albums